The 1929 French Grand Prix (formally, the XXIII Grand Prix de l'Automobile Club de France) was a Grand Prix motor race held at Le Mans on 30 June 1929. The race was held over 37 laps of the 16.34 km (10.15 miles) circuit for a total race distance of 604.58 km (375.67 miles) and was won by "W. Williams," driving a Bugatti.

Noting that the previous old 1.5 Litre formula had been a failure, with very low entries at most races in 1926 and 1927, and with the French Grand Prix run for sports cars in 1928, it was decided that new regulations were needed. For 1929 there was no-longer an engine capacity limit, but as the AIACR, it was decided to require cars to weigh at least 900kg, and allow them to consume no more than 85kg of fuel (14kg per 100km), which was provided in special fuel tanks, which each car carried externally. The race was totally dominated by Williams, who lead from start to finish.

Starting Grid: Positions drawn

Classification

Fastest Lap: "W.Williams", 7m01.0 (139.72 km/h)

References

External links

French Grand Prix
French Grand Prix
Grand Prix